The Twelve Chairs is a 1962 Cuban comedy film directed by Tomás Gutiérrez Alea. The plot based on Ilf and Petrov's 1928 novel of the same name. It was entered into the 3rd Moscow International Film Festival.

Cast
 Enrique Santiesteban as Hipólito Garrigó
 Reynaldo Miravalles as Oscar (as Reinaldo Miravalles)
 René Sánchez as El Cura
 Pilín Vallejo as Gertrudis
 Idalberto Delgado as Ernesto
 Ana Viña (as Ana Viñas)
 Manuel Pereiro
 Pedro Martín Planas
 Raúl Xiqués
 Gilda Hernández
 Silvia Planas

See also
 List of Cuban films

References

External links
 

1962 films
1962 comedy films
1960s Spanish-language films
Cuban black-and-white films
Films directed by Tomás Gutiérrez Alea
Ilf and Petrov
Cuban comedy films